Johnson is a township in the Canadian province of Ontario, located within the Algoma District. The township had a population of 751 in the Canada 2016 Census, up from 750 in the 2011 census.

Communities

Marie.

Located in Desbarats is Central Algoma Secondary School, a high school of 250+ students which serves a catchment area extending from Echo Bay to Thessalon. In 2013 a grade 7 and 8 program was put into place in CASS.

West of Desbarats on Highway 17 is Ripple Rock, a unique rock cut that was uncovered with the blasting of the rock cuts through northern Ontario for the creation of the Trans-Canada Highway. The ripples in the rock were created two billion years ago by waves in a shallow body of water.  It was buried and through pressure it became sandstone.

Puddingstone Road in Johnson Township was named for a type of puddingstone locally known as Jasper conglomerate and often found in the area as well as at nearby St. Joseph Island. Puddingstone is a mixture of different sized grains and pebbles held together by finer sand. The type found in this area is St. Joseph Island Puddingstone, which contains red and brown pieces of jasper.

Since the early 2000s, about 20 Mennonite families from Southern Ontario moved to the Desbarats area. Along with other local farmers, they sell their produce at the Desbarats Farmers' Market on Friday evenings and Saturday mornings.

Demographics 

Population trend:
 Population in 2016: 751
 Population in 2011: 750
 Population in 2006: 701
 Population in 2001: 658
 Population in 1996: 729
 Population in 1991: 685

Transportation

Ontario Northland provides intercity motor coach service to the main community of Desbarats as a stop along its Sault Ste. Marie–Sudbury–North Bay–Ottawa route, with one bus a day each headed eastbound and westbound from Sunday to Friday, with no service on Saturdays.

See also
List of townships in Ontario

References

External links

Municipalities in Algoma District
Single-tier municipalities in Ontario
Township municipalities in Ontario